Viscerocranium may refer to one of two related concepts:
 In human anatomy and development, viscerocranium usually refers to elements of the skull that are not part of the braincase (as opposed to the neurocranium), and which can be subdivided into:
 The membranous viscerocranium, comprising the facial skeleton
 The cartilaginous viscerocranium, comprising the splanchnocranium
 In comparative anatomy of vertebrates, viscerocranium usually refers specifically to the splanchnocranium (as opposed to the endocranium and dermatocranium)

 Human anatomy
 Vertebrate anatomy